Özlem Yalman (born 30 April 1977 in Antalya, Turkey) is a Turkish female pro basketball referee, a former basketball player, and a school teacher for physical education.

Early years
Özlem was born in Adana, Turkey in 1977 to Nezih Yalman, who died in Izmir at age 64 in 2014.

She studied Physical Education and Sports at Ege University in Izmir. After graduation, she was appointed teacher for physical education in a school at Antalya, in which she serves as the only instructor for her branch.

Sports career
Yalman played basketball during her university years, and in Karşıyaka Basket in the Turkish Women's Basketball Second League.

In 1995, she obtained a referee license, and in 2004 she was promoted to A-class official status. Currently, she officiates basketball matches of the Turkish Basketball Super League and Turkish Women's Basketball League.

After successfully completing the FIBA referee candidate program in Bologna, Italy in 2010 and passing the subsequent exam in Gaziantep, Turkey, she became a FIBA-listed referee. Since 2011, she has been tasked to officiate several basketball competitions at world and European level.

International participations

2011
 2011 FIBA Europe Under-18 Championship for Women – August 4–14, Italy

2013
 EuroBasket Women 2013 – June 5–30, France.
 EuroBasket Women 2015 qualification – June 7–25, Israel
 2013 FIBA Europe Under-20 Championship for Women – July 4–14, Turkey
 2013 FIBA Under-19 World Championship for Women – July 18–28, Lithuania

2014
 2013–14 EuroCup Women Final – March 20, Russia.
 2014 FIBA World Championship for Women – September 27 – October 5, Turkey.

2015
 EuroBasket Women 2015 Group C – June 11–15, Hungary
 2015 FIBA Europe Under-20 Championship for Women – July 2–12,  Spain.
 2015 FIBA Europe Under-16 Championship for Women – August 13–23, Portugal
2016
 2015–16 EuroCup Women Final – April 13, France.
2017 FIBA Women's EuroBasket 2017 Final June 25, Prague
2019
 EuroLeague Women Final Four 12–14 April Semi Final & Final
 FIBA Women's EuroBasket 2019 Final – July 7, Serbia

See also
 Turkish women in sports

References

1977 births
Sportspeople from Adana
Ege University alumni
Turkish schoolteachers
Turkish women's basketball players
Turkish basketball referees
Living people
FIBA referees
Turkish women referees and umpires